DIMBOA (2,4-dihydroxy-7-methoxy-1,4-benzoxazin-3-one) is a naturally occurring hydroxamic acid, a benzoxazinoid. DIMBOA is a powerful antibiotic present in maize, wheat, rye, and related grasses,

DIMBOA was first identified in maize in 1962 as the "corn sweet substance". Etiolated maize seedlings have a very sweet, almost saccharin-like taste due to their high DIMBOA content.

The biosynthesis pathway from leading from maize primary metabolism to the production of DIMBOA has been fully identified.  DIMBOA is stored as an inactive precursor, DIMBOA-glucoside, which is activated by glucosidases in response to insect feeding,

In maize, DIMBOA functions as natural defense against European corn borer (Ostrinia nubilalis) larvae,  beet armyworms (Spodoptera exigua), corn leaf aphids (Rhopalosiphum maidis),  other damaging insect pests, and pathogens, including fungi and bacteria. The exact level of DIMBOA varies between individual plants, but higher concentrations are typically found in young seedlings and the concentration decreases as the plant ages. Natural variation in the Bx1 gene influences the DIMBOA content of maize seedlings. In adult maize plants, the DIMBOA concentration is low, but it is induced rapidly in response to insect feeding. The methyltransferases Bx10, Bx11, and Bx12 convert DIMBOA into HDMBOA (2-hydroxy-4,7-dimethoxy-1,4-benzoxazin-3-one), which can be more toxic for insect herbivores.

In addition to serving as a direct defensive compound due to its toxicity, DIMBOA can also function as a signaling molecule, leading to the accumulation of callose in response to treatment with chitosan (a fungal elicitor) and aphid feeding.

DIMBOA can also form complexes with iron in the rhizosphere and thereby enhance maize iron supply.

Specialized insect pests such as the western corn rootworm (Diabrotica virgifera virgifera) can detect complexes between DIMBOA and iron and use these complexes for host identification and foraging.

References 

Hydroxamic acids
Benzoxazines
Resorcinol ethers
Lactols
Lactams